Fishhook is an unincorporated community in Pike County, Illinois, United States.

Notable residents 
Fishhook is where Robert Earl Hughes, once billed the world's largest man by the Guinness Book of World Records, grew up.  The town has a small monument to him in its business district.

References

Unincorporated communities in Pike County, Illinois
Unincorporated communities in Illinois